Ridhiwani Jakaya Kikwete (born 16 April 1979) is a Tanzanian lawyer and CCM politician. He is currently a Deputy Minister of State Office of the President Public Service Management and Good Governance in Tanzania. Member of Parliament for Chalinze Constituency (CCM).

Early life and career
He was educated at Shaaban Robert Secondary and Mkwawa Secondary schools. He then joined the University of Dar es Salaam and graduated with an LLB.

Political career
Ridhiwani is a member of the governing Chama Cha Mapinduzi. In March 2014, he succeeded in being nominated to contest for the Chalinze by-election following the death of Saidi Bwanamdogo. He received 758 (55.6%) of the 1,368 votes cast in the party's internal opinion poll. In April 2014 he won in a landslide victory by more than 86% in Chalinze constituency by-election. In January 2022, he was appointed Deputy Minister of land, housing and human settlements.

Personal life
He is the firstborn of fourth president of Tanzania, Jakaya Kikwete. He married Arafa in 2008.

References

External links
 
 Ridhiwani has rights to vie for Chalinze parliamentary seat

1979 births
Living people
21st-century Tanzanian lawyers
Chama Cha Mapinduzi politicians
Shaaban Robert Secondary School alumni
Mkwawa Secondary School alumni
University of Dar es Salaam alumni